Zodarion vicinum is a spider species found in England and Italy.

See also 
 List of Zodariidae species

References

External links 

vicinum
Spiders of Europe
Spiders described in 1935